Vasool Raja is a 2013 Indian Telugu-language action drama film directed by Karthikeya Gopalakrishna. The film stars Navdeep in a thief role and Srihari in a role of cop, while Rithu Barmecha, Brahmanandam, Satyam Rajesh plays supporting roles. The film was produced under the BM Studios banner by Batthula Rathanpaandu and Mahankali Divakar, Ramaswamy has written the film's dialogues and music was composed by Chinni Charan.The film released on 11 April 2013.

Plot 
Raja (Navdeep) is a part time robber. He makes his source of revenue by robbing cars. One a day he meets Janaki alias Jaanu(Ritu Bharmecha). At the same time he falls in love with Jaanu. He introduced himself as a business man. Time passes and Jaanu starts love with Vasool Raja.

They both get serious in love and they are planning to settle down in life. Then Vasool Raja plans his final robbery. He joined with a group who import illegal arms in to the country. Then ACP Yadav (Sri Hari) comes into the picture who is appointed to take care of the illegal arms. Then what happens to Vasool Raja? What happens to his love story? is rest of the film.

Cast 
Navdeep as Raja
Srihari as ACP Yadav
Ritu Barmecha as Janaki alias Jaanu
Brahmanandam 
Satyam Rajesh
Thagubothu Ramesh
Kadhal Dhandapani
Jyothi
Gemini Suresh

Soundtrack 

The soundtrack was composed by Chinni Charan, songs were penned by Chinni Charan, Sagar Narayana, Mahie.

References

External links 
 

2013 films
2010s Telugu-language films
Films shot in Telangana